Ross Johnson may refer to:
Ross Johnson (rugby union) (born 1986), Cardiff Blues rugby union player
F. Ross Johnson (1931–2016), Canadian businessman
Ross Johnson (lacrosse) (born 1980), United States professional lacrosse player
Ross Johnson (politician) (1939-2017), former California State Senator and Assemblyman
Ross Johnson (Australian footballer) (born 1951), Australian rules footballer
Ross Johnson (English footballer) (born 1970), English footballer

See also
Ross Johnstone (1926–2009), ice hockey player